The Rugby Football League Championship Second Division was founded in 1902 and was the second tier of professional rugby league in the UK until 2003.

During the 1990s a third division was established and there is automatic promotion between the second and third division.

History
The Second Division was formed in 1902 by splitting the RFL Championship into two divisions of 18. After three seasons the Second Division was abolished and not resurrected until 1962. Two seasons later in 1964 the Second Division was scrapped for the second time.

The division was resurrected again in 1973 and has been played every season since. During the 1991-92 season, a third division was established and, for the first time, two teams were relegated. There was no regular relegation from the Second Division until 2003.

In 1995, in anticipation for the Super League starting in 1996, six teams were relegated from the RFL Championship, five were relegated to the Second Division and one was relegated to form the Third Division. Controversy was caused as London Broncos, who finished 4th in the Second Division, were elected to the Championship ahead of Keighley, Batley and Huddersfield.

In 2003, the divisions under Super League were reorganised into the National Leagues with Second and Third Divisions becoming National League One and National League Two.

Results

Winners

§ Denotes club now defunct

See also

 Rugby Football League Championship
 Rugby Football League Championship Third Division
 Rugby League Championships

References

External links

Rugby league competitions in the United Kingdom
Rugby Football League
Rugby Football League Championship